Japaratinga is a municipality located in the Brazilian state of Alagoas. Its population is 8,403 (2020) and its area is 86 km².

Geography
Japaratinga is located near the coast.

Climate
Japaratinga has a Tropical forest. Rainforests are characterized by high rainfall, with definitions setting minimum normal annual rainfall between 2,000 mm (about 78 inches or 2 meters) and 1700 mm (about 67 inches). The soil can be poor because high rainfall tends to leach out soluble nutrients. There are several common characteristics of tropical rainforest trees. Tropical rainforest species frequently possess one or more of the following attributes not commonly seen in trees of higher latitudes or trees in drier conditions on the same latitude.

Demographics
As of the census of 2005, there were around 6.727 people, living in Japaratinga city. According to the census 2005, the racial makeup of the city was majority White and Multiracial; minority Black or African American. People of Portuguese, Italian, Spanish, French, American and English descent form the largest ethnic groups in the city.

Economy
Japaratinga has a number of Hotels and Pousadas (small hotels). Tourism is the most important economic activity in the city.

References

Web site
 Japaratinga.tur.br

Municipalities in Alagoas